Clarence Ray Carpenter (usually credited as C. R. Carpenter) (November 28, 1905 – March 1, 1975) was an American primatologist who was one of the first scientific investigators to film and videotape the behavior of primates in their natural environments.

Born in Lincoln County, North Carolina, Carpenter earned his Bachelor of Science (1928) and Master of Science (1929) degrees at Duke University and his Doctor of Philosophy (1932) degree at Stanford University.

From 1931 to 1934, Carpenter conducted field research on the natural behavior of primates under the sponsorship of Yale University professor Robert M. Yerkes.  According to Irven DeVore, "for the succeeding thirty years almost all of the accurate information available on the behavior of monkeys and apes living in natural environments was the result of Carpenter's research and writing."  Carpenter's lar gibbon, Hylobates lar carpenteri, is named in his honor.

Books
 Behavioral Regulators of Behavior in Primates.  C. R. Carpenter, ed.  Lewisburg, Pennsylvania: Bucknell University Press, 1974.  Hardcover: , .

Films
 C.R. Carpenter Primate Studies Series Pennsylvania State University

Papers

 "Behavior and Social Relations of the Howling Monkey," Comparative Psychology Monographs, Johns Hopkins University, May, 1934.
 "Field Study in Siam of the Behavior and social Relations of the Gibbon," Comparative Psychology Monographs, Johns Hopkins University, December, 1940.
 "Societies of Monkeys and Apes," Biological Symposia, v. 8, 1942.
 "Evolutionary interpretation of human behavior," Transactions of the New York Academy of Sciences, 1942.
 "Social Behavior of the Primates," Colloques internationaux du Centre national de la recherche scientifique, v. 34, March, 1950.

References

 Biographical sketch at Primate Info Net.

1905 births
1975 deaths
People from Lincoln County, North Carolina
Primatologists
American mammalogists
Duke University alumni
20th-century American zoologists